Udu or UDU may refer to:

Places
Udu, Kale, Burma
Udu, Nigeria

Other uses
Udu, an Igbo percussion instrument
Uduk language
Integration by substitution, also known as "udu substitution"
Ulster Defence Union, an Irish unionist organisation